Monody is the fourth album by Canadian artist Mantler (Chris A. Cummings), released in 2010.

Described as "teeming with slow jams, a love for the '70s and an honesty that saves it from becoming retro-obsessed kitsch", Mantler features many guest stars, including Sandro Perri, Owen Pallett, Ben Gunning, Jeremy Greenspan and the string section of Ohbijou.

Reception
The album was met with positive critical reception in Germany, the U.K. and Toronto . Allmusic awarded the album 4 out of 5 stars.  The music was showcased live at the Tranzac Club in Toronto, and Queen Elizabeth Hall in South Bank, London, and videos were produced to accompany the release.
A song from the same project, "I Guarantee You A Good Time" (featuring Steamboat and Sandro Perri) was released as a single shortly after the LP.

Track listing
All tracks written by Chris A. Cummings.
 Fortune Smiled Again
 Childman
 Also Close the Rainbow
 Monody
 Fresh and Fair
 Author
 Breaking Past the Day
 Crying at the Movies
 Maiden Name
 In Stride
 Mount Shasta

Personnel

Ernest Agbuya – e-Bow, acoustic guitar, electric guitar, Percussion, background vocals
Sam Allison – arranger, bass (acoustic), bass (electric), dobro, electric guitar, percussion, timpani, background vocals
Kelci Archibald – background vocals
Jonathon Challoner – trumpet
Chris A. Cummings – arp omni, ARP string ensemble, clavinet, composer, fender rhodes, flute arrangement, moog bass, percussion, piano, roland juno 6, string arrangements, vocals, wurlitzer
Ryan Driver – flute
Dennis Frey – background vocals
Teilhard Frost – bongos, congas, guest artist, percussion
Zack G. – electric guitar, producer
Mike Gennaro – drums, percussion
Jana Gontscharuk – paintings
George Graves – mastering
Jeremy Greenspan – acoustic guitar, keyboards, producer, programming, background vocals
Ben Gunning – electric guitar, background vocals
Anissa Hart – cello, strings
Jennifer Mecija – strings, violin
Pat Joyes – background vocals
Jan Lankisch – design
Marcus Quin – clarinet, clarinet (bass), drums
Owen Pallett – brass arrangement
Sandro Perri – electric guitar, pedal steel
Matias Rozenberg – arranger, cymbals, E-Bow, electric guitar, Percussion, Trombone, background vocals
R.J. Satchithananthan – trombone
Micajah Sturgess – french horn
Leon Taheny – drums, producer
Rob Teehan – tuba

References

External links
Discogs entry
Performed live at Queen Elizabeth Hall
Official video release

2010 albums